D. Bryant (born October 22, 1980) is a former American football quarterback.

Early life
Born the son of Marvin and Brenda Bryant, D. attended Cass Technical High School, in Detroit, Michigan. There he lettered in four sports; football, basketball, baseball and track and field. He was named All-City twice in football, garnering All-State honors as well as named to Michigan's 'Dream Team' as a senior. Played both safety and quarterback. A standout basketball player, garnering All-City honors twice including the City Championship in 1998. He averaged 18 points and over seven rebounds for his prep career playing guard. Only played one year of baseball as a sophomore, playing third base. Shined in track and field, claiming the City Championship in the 4x100 meter relay as a senior. Finished fifth in the state in 1998 on the 4x200 meter relay team.

College career

Duke
Bryant was a dual sport athlete at Duke University playing football and basketball.

During his freshman year, 1998–1999, Bryant was a reserve with Duke University's basketball team. The Blue Devils went 37–2 overall and were undefeated in the Atlantic Coast Conference.  They finished #2 in the country after losing the 1999 national championship game to the University of Connecticut. Three of his teammates later had long professional careers: i.e., Shane Battier, Elton Brand, and Corey Maggette. Bryant did not play basketball after his freshman year, concentrating exclusively on football.

Bryant became the starting quarterback at Duke midway through the 2000 season (when he was a sophomore) and continued in that role as a junior. During his junior season, he passed for 2,454 yards and 11 touchdowns.  Duke's football program was somewhat less successful than the basketball program during those years. The team went 0–11 both years while Bryant was on the active roster.

In 2002, after failing to be eligible because of academic reasons, Bryant decided to transfer.

Iowa Wesleyan
D. transferred after his junior season to Iowa Wesleyan College. He played in only one game for Iowa Wesleyan in 2002, tossing for 313 yards and five touchdowns in a win against Peru State College. After the season, Bryant was one of 12 quarterbacks that received an invite the 2003 NFL Scouting Combine.

Professional career

Albany Conquest
On May 8, 2004, Bryant was named the started quarterback for the Albany Conquest.

Manchester Wolves
On March 31, 2006, it was announced that D. had signed with the Manchester Wolves.

South Georgia Wildcats
In 2007, he became a member of the South Georgia Wildcats, where he became only the third quarterback in AF2 history to throw for 100 career touchdowns and set the single-season passing record (4,680 yards). The team went 10–6, losing in the National Conference Semifinals, 49–28 to the Tulsa Talons.

Georgia Force
He was signed by the Georgia Force in 2008, but was released before training camp started.

Kansas City Brigade
The Kansas City Brigade gave Bryant a chance, with a 2-day camp invite, where he won a spot on the roster. For the season, Bryant completed 215 of 317 passes, for 2,338 yards, with 40 touchdowns and 11 interceptions. Those numbers were impressive enough to get him named to the 2008 AFL All Rookie Team.

New Orleans VooDoo
On May 18, 2011, Bryant was named the started quarterback for the New Orleans VooDoo. He started for the struggling Danny Wimprine.

Point University
On January 3, 2012, Bryant join the coaching staff at Point University as the assistant football coach for quarterbacks.

References

External links
 D. Bryant – New Orleans VooDoo Bio

1980 births
Living people
American football quarterbacks
Duke Blue Devils football players
Duke Blue Devils men's basketball players
Iowa Wesleyan Tigers football players
Manchester Wolves players
Kansas City Brigade players
New Orleans VooDoo players
South Georgia Wildcats players
Georgia Force players
Albany Conquest players
Basketball players from Detroit
Players of American football from Detroit
American men's basketball players
Cass Technical High School alumni